Back at the Laundromat is an album by U.S. Bombs, released in 2001.

Critical reception
Exclaim! praised the "tough yet melodic sound," writing that "a Sex Pistols influence runs through this and is bolstered by the snarling vocals of skate legend Duane Peters."

Track listing 
All tracks by Peters/Martinez except as noted

 "Tora Tora Tora"
 "Die Alone" (Peters/Walston)
 "The Rubber Room"
 "Lunch In A Sack"
 "Bloody Rag"
 "New Killer" (Peters/Hanna)
 "Cirenda"
 "The Contract"
 "The Wig Out"
 "Rumble Fishers"
 "Yer Country"
 "Good Night" (Peters/Walston)

Personnel 
 Duane Peters - lead vocals
 Kerry Martinez - guitar, background vocals
 Wade Walston - bass, background vocals
 Chip Hanna - drums, background vocals, record engineer

References

U.S. Bombs albums
2001 albums